This is a list of cast members who have appeared in Geordie Shore.

Current cast
This is a list of the current cast members appearing in the show in order of their first appearance.

Former cast
This is a list of the former cast members who have appeared in the show in order of their first appearance.

Duration of cast 

  = Cast member features in this series as part of the main cast
  = Cast member features in this series as recurring
  = Cast member features in this series as a guest
  = Cast member does not feature in this series

Cast changes
The original cast members were: Gary "Gaz" Beadle, Charlotte-Letitia Crosby, Jay Gardner, Holly Hagan, Greg Lake, Sophie Kasaei, Vicky Pattison and James Tindale. Lake made a guest appearance in the opening episode of series 2 where he announced his departure. He was replaced by Ricci Guarnaccio and Rebecca Walker. The third series saw no cast member changes.

After the third series, Gardner and Walker exited the show and auditions were held to find their replacements for the fourth series of Geordie Shore. Daniel Thomas-Tuck and Scott Timlin joined the cast. The fifth series saw no cast member changes.

On 2 April 2013, it was announced that Thomas-Tuck and Guarnaccio had left Geordie Shore and would not be returning for the sixth series. On 9 April 2013 it was confirmed that former cast member Jay Gardner, who featured from series 1–3, would be returning briefly for the sixth series. The sixth series began 9 July 2013. On 12 July 2013 it was announced that Sophie Kasaei had been sacked from the show following an incident which took place in a nightclub where she used a racist term off camera. Sophie will have appeared in the show from series 1–7. On 13 August 2013, it was confirmed that Sophie's cousin, Marnie Simpson had joined the cast for Series 7. On 24 September 2013, it was revealed that Jay Gardner would make another brief return to the series, this time in the seventh series.

On 4 April 2014, it was announced that 26-year-old Aaron Chalmers had joined the cast for the eighth series. He had previously appeared during the second series when he took Holly out for a date. It was then confirmed on 10 June 2014, that Kyle Christie had also joined the cast for the eighth series. He has previously hooked up with Charlotte and Vicky, and is a friend of Marnie's. On 28 October 2014, it was revealed that the upcoming ninth series of the show would be Vicky's last series. On 17 November 2014, despite a tenth series already being announced, it was confirmed that this would be James' last series after he would be axed from the show at the end of the series. On 29 November 2014, it was confirmed that Chloe Etherington had joined the cast for the tenth series. It was also confirmed that Nathan Henry had joined the cast for this series.

In 2015, during the eleventh series, Kyle Christie made his final appearance after his turbulent relationship with Holly broke down. In November 2015 it was confirmed that Chantelle Connelly and Marty McKenna had joined the cast for the twelfth series. Marty had previously appeared during the third series of Ex on the Beach. Marnie also left at the end of the eleventh series because of the engagement proposal to former The Only Way Is Essex star Ricky Rayment, however her circumstances changed and rejoined for the twelfth series. In the Big Birthday Battle, former cast mates returned. These were Dan, Jay, James, Ricci, Sophie and Kyle (not in a certain order).

On 1 June 2016, Charlotte Crosby announced that she had quit Geordie Shore meaning that the Big Birthday Battle would be her final series. It was later confirmed that Sophie would replace her as she had expressed her desire to return following the Big Birthday Battle. Chantelle departed the cast during the thirteenth series meaning the series would be her last. Also in the thirteenth series Kyle rejoined following making up with Holly during the Big Birthday Battle series.

It was announced that the thirteenth series trailer in October 2016, meant the cast would be in Magaluf, Ibiza, Kavos and Ayia Napa. During filming series 13, it was cited that Sophie Kasaei had made another comeback since Big Birthday Battle earlier in the year. In December 2016, it was announced that Holly and Kyle would be leaving Geordie Shore together in the thirteenth series finale.

In November 2016, the cast announced via Twitter that filming for the fourteenth series had commenced and Sophie Kasaei had made yet another comeback, however she had permanently rejoined the main cast since her departure in the seventh series. Abbie Holborn was selected to become permanent. Season fifteenth featured the departure of Marty McKenna and Scott Timlin after they were both fired from the show, it was also the last season to feature original cast member Gaz Beadle following his decision to resign. Elettra Lamborghini visits the cast while they were in Rome.

Series sixteenth featured new cast members Sam Gowland and Stephanie Snowdon. Aaron Chalmers and Marnie Simpson announced their departure, this being their final season. It was later announced that Snowdon was fired. Season seventeen introduced five new cast members: Alex MacPherson, Chrysten Zenoni, Dee Nguyen, Grant Molloy, and Nick Murdoch. Chrysten and Grant then left the season. The new cast member Adam Guthrie has also joined in to replace Grant. Holly Hagan returned as a main member after her last appearance during the thirteenth season. After the seventeenth season, Dee and Nick did not return to the show. Alex also left at the end of the seventeenth season, however, he rejoined the eighteenth season. Faith Mullen joined the cast in the eighteenth season. Scott Timlin returned to the show in the role of boss.

Faith Mullen, Abbie Holborn and Adam Guthrie did not return for the nineteenth season, however the last two appeared on a recurring basis throughout this season. Alex also left the show, however, he returned a second time. Before the series, four new cast members were confirmed, Beau Brennan, Bethan Kershaw, Natalie Phillips, and Tahlia Chung. That season featured the latest appearances from Scott Timlin and Alex MacPherson, and original cast members Sophie Kasaei and Holly Hagan.

In the twentieth season it was confirmed that former cast members Abbie Holborn and James Tindale returned. Sam Gowland and Tahlia Chung left the show after that season. For the twenty-first season, new cast members Amelia Lily, Anthony Kennedy, and Louis Shaw joined the cast. Nathalie Phillips left the program. Beau Brennan did not return to the show after the twenty-first season. The twenty-second season switched to a dating format and featured a group of rookies acting as dates for the cast members, Marty McKenna returned to the show after being fired in the fifteenth season.

The twenty-third reunion season saw the return of original cast members Charlotte Crosby, Holly Hagan, Sophie Kasaei, James Tindale, and Jay Gardner, adn Greg Lake made a brief appearance. Veterans Ricci Guarnaccio, Scott Timlin, Marnie Simpson, Kyle Christie, and Aaron Chalmers also returned, in addition to Zahida Allen and Chantelle Connelly, this on the occasion of the majority of the show's overall cast meeting for the tenth anniversary of the program.

References 

Cast members
Geordie Shore
Geordie Shore